"Hold My Heart" is a 2016 single released by American violinist Lindsey Stirling.

Background
"Hold My Heart" is the fourth single released from Stirling's album Brave Enough. The track features vocals by ZZ Ward. Stirling confirmed in an interview the basis for the lyrics she wrote with Ward:

As part of the official album booklet Stirling wrote:

"Hold My Heart" featured regularly on Stirling's tours during 2016-2018. Following Brave Enough reaching number one on the Billboard Classical Albums chart, Stirling and Ward were invited to perform the song at the Americana Lounge in Hollywood for the Grammy Awards in 2017.

Music video
There were two music videos released for "Hold My Heart".

Official video
The video was released on 16 November 2016 in line with the single release date. The video was based on the story of Alice in Wonderland and featured Stirling as the White Rabbit and ZZ Ward as the Queen of Hearts. Alice became Alex for the video, which was directed by Sherif Higazy.

Phelba edition
A second video for "Hold My Heart" was released in March 2017. Stirling played an exaggerated version of herself, and also played her superfan — Phelba — made famous by Stirling on her own YouTube channel. ZZ Ward returned for this video, alongside guest appearances from Lilly Singh, Rosanna Pansino, iJustine and Cassey Ho. The video was produced as part of a collaboration with HP for their Sprocket campaign. The video was directed by Alissa Torvinen.

Charts
"Hold My Heart" reached number 15 on the Billboard Dance/Electronic Streaming Songs chart.

References

2016 singles
2016 songs
Lindsey Stirling songs